The 2017–18 Missouri Valley Conference men's basketball season began with practices in October 2017, followed by the start of the 2017–18 NCAA Division I men's basketball season in November. Conference play began in late December 2017 and concluded in March with the Missouri Valley Conference tournament at Scottrade Center in St. Louis, Missouri.

With a win against Evansville on February 18, 2018, Loyola clinched at least a share of its first-ever Missouri Valley Conference regular season championship. With a win over Southern Illinois on February 21, the Ramblers clinched the outright MVC championship.

Loyola defeated Illinois State in the championship game to win the MVC tournament and received the conference's automatic bid to the NCAA tournament.

This season marked the first season with Valparaiso as a member of the conference. The Crusaders were invited to join the conference after Wichita State left the conference to join the American Athletic Conference.

Loyola received the conference's only bid to the NCAA tournament and advanced to the Final Four before losing to Michigan.

Drake was the only other conference school that received a bid to a postseason tournament, receiving a bid to the CollegeInsider.com Tournament where they went 1–1.

Head coaches

Coaching changes 
Drake's fourth-year head coach Ray Giacoletti resigned on December 6, 2016 after the first eight games of the season. Assistant coach Jeff Rutter was named interim head coach. Following the season, the school chose not to keep Jeff Rutter as head coach and hired Niko Medved, former head coach at Furman, as the Bulldogs' new head coach.

Coaches

Notes: 
 All records, appearances, titles, etc. are from time with current school only. 
 Overall and MVC records are from time at current school and are through the end of the season.
 Lottich and Moser's conference records only includes MVC play, not prior Horizon League records.

Preseason

Preseason poll 
Source

Preseason All-MVC teams

Source

Regular season

Conference matrix
This table summarizes the head-to-head results between teams in conference play. Each team played 18 conference games, playing each team twice.

Player of the week
Throughout the regular season, the Missouri Valley Conference named a player and newcomer of the week.

Conference Awards 

Source

Postseason

Missouri Valley Conference tournament

Teams were seeded by conference record, with ties broken by record between the tied teams followed by overall adjusted RPI, if necessary. The top six seeds received first-round byes.

* denotes overtime period

NCAA tournament

The winner of the MVC tournament, Loyola, received the conference's automatic bid to the 2018 NCAA Division I men's basketball tournament.

References

 
Missouri Valley Conference men's basketball tournament